This is a list of Archaeological Protected Monuments in Nuwara Eliya District, Sri Lanka.

Notes

References

External links
 Department of Archaeology - Sri Lanka
 Ministry of Culture and the Arts

Archaeology
 
Buildings and structures in Nuwara Eliya District